Luis Miguel Rodríguez, (born January 1, 1985 in San Miguel de Tucumán), nicknamed Pulga (flea), is an Argentine professional footballer who plays as a forward for Colón of the Primera Division in Argentina.

Career 

El Pulga was a key player for the Atlético Tucumán team that obtained in two years the promotion from the Torneo Argentino A (regionalized third division) to the Argentine Primera División (first division). On 11 June 2010 the 25-year-old forward left Atlético Tucumán and joined on loan to Newell's Old Boys.

International career 

In 2009 Argentine national team's coach Diego Maradona surprised the media by calling Luis Rodríguez for a friendly match against Ghana. The team was formed exclusively by players of the Argentine league.

Honours 
Atlético Tucumán
Torneo Argentino A: 2007–08
Primera B Nacional: 2008–09

Colón
Copa de la Liga Profesional: 2021

Individual
Primera B Nacional Top scorer: 
2008–09 (20 goals for Atlético Tucumán)2012–13 (20 goals for Atlético Tucumán)

References

External links 
 Argentine Primera statistics at Fútbol XXI 
 
 

Living people
1985 births
Sportspeople from San Miguel de Tucumán
Argentine footballers
Association football forwards
Atlético Tucumán footballers
Racing de Córdoba footballers
Newell's Old Boys footballers
Aldosivi footballers
Club Atlético Colón footballers
Club de Gimnasia y Esgrima La Plata footballers
Argentine Primera División players
Primera Nacional players
Torneo Argentino A players